The Canada men's national soccer team represents Canada in international soccer competitions since 1924. They are overseen by the Canadian Soccer Association, the governing body for soccer in Canada. They have been a member of FIFA since 1948 and a member of CONCACAF since 1961.

Their most significant achievements are winning the 1985 CONCACAF Championship to qualify for the 1986 FIFA World Cup and winning the 2000 CONCACAF Gold Cup to qualify for the 2001 FIFA Confederations Cup. Canada is the only national team to win a Gold Cup aside from regional powerhouses Mexico and the United States. Canada also won a gold medal in the 1904 Summer Olympics. Canada participated in its second World Cup in 2022, and will co-host, along with the United States and Mexico, the 2026 FIFA World Cup.

History

Early years

Soccer was being played in Canada with the Dominion Football Association (1877) and Western Football Association (1880) acting as precursors to the modern-day Canadian Soccer Association. In 1885, the WFA sent a team to New Jersey to take on a side put forth by the American Football Association, the then-unofficial governing body of the sport in the United States. In an unofficial friendly, Canada defeated the United States 1–0 in East Newark, New Jersey. The American team won 3–2 in a return match one year later. In 1888, a team represented the WFA in a tour of the British Isles, earning a record of nine wins, five draws, and nine losses. The squad comprised 16 Canadian-born players with the only exception being tour organizer David Forsyth, who had immigrated to Canada one year after his birth.

In 1904 Galt F.C. represented the WFA at the Olympic Games in St Louis, Missouri. As just one of three teams competing, Galt defeated two American clubs, Christian Brothers College (7–0) and St. Rose (4–0) to win the tournament. The Toronto Mail and Empire of November 18, 1904, reports that "Immediately after the game, the Galt aggregation, numbering about 50 persons, retired to the office of James W. Sullivan, chief of the Department of Physical Culture, where they received their prize. After a short talk by Mr. James E. Conlon of the Physical Culture Department, Mayor Mundy, of the City of Galt, presented each player on the winning team with a beautiful gold medal." The medals are clearly engraved with the name of the company in St. Louis that made them.

In 1905, a British team of touring amateurs nicknamed the "Pilgrims" toured Canada, with their match against Galt billed as the "championship of the world". The match was played in front of 3500 fans in Galt, now part of Cambridge, Ontario, and ended in a 3–3 draw. Earlier the Pilgrims had been beaten 2–1 by Berlin Rangers, in the city now known as Kitchener.

The Canadian national team toured Australia in 1924, playing a series of "test" friendlies against their hosts, including their first official match, a 3–2 friendly defeat to the Australian national team in Brisbane, Queensland on June 7, 1924. Canada also played Australia at the Jubilee Oval, Adelaide on Saturday July 12, 1924, and defeated them by 4 goals to 1. In 1925, Canada played their old rivals, the United States, in Montreal, winning 1–0 on Ed McLaine's goal. In a return match in November 1925 in Brooklyn, New York, Canada was defeated 1–6. One year later, Canada lost 2–6 to the Americans in the same city before playing four internationals in a 1927 tour of New Zealand.

The New Zealand tour included a total of 22 games, of which Canada won 19 with only 2 defeats. Most of the games were against local combined teams although Canada also played New Zealand in four occasions (scores: 2–2, 2–1, 0–1, 4–1).

1957 to 1987

Following the lead of British soccer associations, Canada withdrew from FIFA in 1928 over a dispute regarding broken time payments to amateur players. They rejoined the confederation in 1946 and took part in World Cup qualifying in the North American Football Confederation (NAFC) (a precursor to CONCACAF) for the first time in 1957, the first time they had played as a national team in 30 years. Under the guidance of head coach Don Petrie, Canada defeated the United States in Toronto 5–1 in their opening game, but lost two games in Mexico (failing to play a home game due to financial reasons) 0–2 and 0–3 before defeating the US 3–2 in St. Louis. Mexico advanced as group winners, meaning that Canada missed out on the World Cup in 1958 in Sweden.

Canada withdrew from World Cup qualifying for 1962 and did not enter a team for 1966. They did compete in soccer however at the 1967 Pan American Games, their first time to do so in the sixth edition of the games, which they hosted in Winnipeg. Canada finished fourth place, helped somewhat by defending champion Brazil's absence.

A 0–0 draw away to Bermuda meant the Canadians, under coach Peter Dinsdale, could not advance out of the first round of qualifying for the 1970 World Cup. Dinsdale was replaced by Frank Pike. In their second participation in soccer at the Pan Am games, held in Cali, Canada finished second in their opening round group (to hosts Colombia). In the final group round however, they managed only one win (over Colombia) and finished next to last.

Canada again failed at the first hurdle in qualifying for the 1974 World Cup. Under German head coach Eckhard Krautzun, they finished second in a home and away qualifying group for the 1973 CONCACAF Championship (to Mexico). For the 1975 Pan Am Games, Canada, along with most of the larger Pan Am countries, sent their Olympic team, which was amateur (and senior aged), to compete. After narrowly qualifying out of the first round, the Canucks were soundly defeated by Costa Rica, Cuba, and Mexico, conceding a total of 14 goals while scoring none. At the Summer Olympics at home the following year, under head coach Colin Morris, the amateur Canadian side failed to get out of the first round, losing both of their games. This despite the brilliant play of Jimmy Douglas, who scored a goal against a Dynamo Kyiv-dominated Soviet Union side and another goal against North Korea, Canada's only two goals in the tournament.

In their North American qualifying group for the 1977 CONCACAF Championship, with both group winners and runners-up now advancing, Canada, again under head coach Krautzun, qualified as runners-up after defeating the Americans 3–0 in a neutral site one-match play-off, played in Port-au-Prince. In the championship, played in Monterrey and Mexico City, Mexico won all five of their matches with a plus 15 goals difference to win the tournament handily. Canada finished fourth.

Matters were different however at the next CONCACAF championship, in 1981, played in Tegucigalpa. Canada entered the tournament raising eyebrows by winning their qualifying group over Mexico and the United States, even achieving a 1–1 draw against Mexico at the Azteca Stadium with Gerry Gray scoring from a direct free kick in the 88th-minute. In the final round, the Canadians opened strongly with a 1–0 win over El Salvador, with Mike Stojanovic the goal-scorer, and a 1–1 draw with Haiti, with Stojanovic scoring again. They next lost to the hosts Honduras 1–2 and then drew Mexico 1–1 with Ian Bridge scoring the equalizer via a corner kick.  A win in their final game against Cuba would have put them through to Spain, but they were held to a 2–2 draw, allowing El Salvador to qualify as tournament runners-up.

1981 through 1985 saw Canada continue to develop under the guidance of English coach Tony Waiters. After a strong performance at the 1984 Summer Olympics, Waiters would see the Maple Leafs through to their first World Cup finals appearance in 1985. A 1–1 away draw to Guatemala was key in allowing them to eliminate Los Chapines in the first round group. The second round was also closely contested, in part as this Canadian squad was strong defensively but had limited ability to score goals. The Canucks managed to eke out a 1–0 away win over Honduras, thanks to a George Pakos winner, hold Costa Rica scoreless in San José, and then in their final game, one they needed to draw to qualify, beat Los Catrachos a second time, 2–1 in St. John's, Newfoundland, with Pakos and Igor Vrablic the goal scorers. The victory not only secured their first World Cup finals berth, but also the crown of CONCACAF champions for the first time, although Mexico did not compete, having already qualified automatically for the World Cup as hosts.

At the 1986 FIFA World Cup, Canada impressed defensively in their first game against France, only conceding a late Jean-Pierre Papin goal after Papin had missed several earlier chances.
However, Canada could not build on their stubborn performance against France, losing their next two matches to both Hungary and the Soviet Union 0–2, finishing the group in last place with zero points.

Four Canadian players (Chris Chueden, Hector Marinaro, David Norman and Vrablic) were involved in a match fixing betting scandal at the Merlion Cup tournament in Singapore two months after the World Cup. The four players were suspended by the Canadian Soccer Association for "bringing the game into disrepute". Norman was reinstated in 1992 after admitting his involvement in the scandal. Vrablic never played for Canada again.

1990s
Qualification for 1990 lasted all of two matches for Canada, a home-and-away series with Guatemala, played in October 1988. The Central Americans won the first game 1–0 in Guatemala City while Canada prevailed in Vancouver 3–2. Tied on goal difference, Los Chapines advanced on away goal rule.

1990 saw Canada take part in the first North American Nations Cup, hosting the three-team tournament. Mexico and Canada sent their full squads, but the US sent a 'B' team. Canada won the tournament after a 1–0 win over the United States on May 6 and a 2–1 win over Mexico on May 13. All three Canadian goals were scored by John Catliff, the tournament's top scorer.

Canada came close to qualifying for the World Cup again in 1994 under the guidance of a defender on the 1986 team, Bob Lenarduzzi. They entered the tournament at the second round stage and advanced as group runners-up. Canada competed strongly in the final qualifying round, drawing their first match in Tegucigalpa after a controversial penalty allowed the Hondurans to draw even, winning their next two, over El Salvador and Honduras in Vancouver, losing convincingly at Azteca Stadium, and winning 2–1 in San Salvador. They went into their final group match against Mexico, in Toronto, needing a win to win the group and thus qualify directly for the World Cup. Canada went up 1–0 on a goal credited to Alex Bunbury off a free kick, but Mexico scored twice to win, 2–1. The loss meant Canada finished second and advanced to an intercontinental play-off series where they needed to win two rounds to qualify for the 1994 FIFA World Cup. The Reds went up against Oceania Football Confederation's champions Australia. Canada won the first leg 2–1 in Edmonton. Australia led the second leg 2–1 at the end of 90 minutes, sending the tie to extra time. There was no score in the extra 30 minutes, meaning the series was decided by a penalty shootout which Australia won 4–1 to eliminate Canada from contention. Australia went on to lose 2–1 on aggregate to Argentina, who advanced to the World Cup.

With the World Cup to be played in the US, Canada had the opportunity to play a number of high-profile squads in tune-up matches. The highlight of this set of matches—played against Morocco, Brazil, Germany, Spain, and the Netherlands all within 13 days—was Canada holding eventual World Cup champions Brazil to a 1–1 draw at Commonwealth Stadium, on a 69th-minute equalizer by Eddy Berdusco, on Canada's only real scoring chance in the game.

With three countries set to qualify out of CONCACAF for the 1998 World Cup, and with Canada handily winning their second round group over El Salvador, Panama, and Cuba, expectations were high for a second qualification in 12 years in the spring of 1997. The aging Canadians, however, fared miserably, losing their opening game to Mexico 0–4 and the following one to the US 0–3. In their next two matches, against El Salvador and Jamaica, they could only manage two 0–0 draws in Vancouver. A 1–0 win over Costa Rica in Edmonton in their next match thanks to a goal by Berdusco gave Canada some hope at the halfway point but losses to both Jamaica and El Salvador away ended any aspirations as they finished bottom of the group with 6 points from 10 games and a −15 goal difference. Having overseen two consecutive World Cup campaigns ending in the side failing to qualify, Lenarduzzi stepped down in 1997 and was replaced by interim head coach Bruce Twamley.

2000s
The Canadian Soccer Association turned to another German to lead the senior national team in 1998 with the signing of Holger Osieck. Success came quickly with Canada winning the CONCACAF Gold Cup in February 2000. After emerging from the first round on a coin-toss tiebreaker with invited side Republic of Korea, the Canucks scored a quarter-final upset win over Mexico. The win set the stage for an unprecedented run to the final, where Canada defeated Colombia 2–0 at Los Angeles Memorial Coliseum. Canada swept the awards ceremony, with goalkeeper Craig Forrest winning MVP honours, Carlo Corazzin securing the Golden Boot, and Richard Hastings named Rookie of the Tournament.

Expectations were again high following the winter's result, but the campaign sputtered. A positive 1–0 away result in Havana in June was followed by a listless 0–0 home draw against Cuba. For the semi-final round two out of four teams advanced. Canada was eliminated from World Cup contention after finishing third in the semi-final round. Canada managed just one goal in 6 games while conceding 8 to finish third in the standings, well adrift of advancing sides Trinidad and Tobago and Mexico.

Winning the Gold Cup earned Canada a place in the 2001 Confederations Cup, where the highlight was holding Brazil to a 0–0 draw. The Gold Cup victory also won them an invitation to compete in the Copa América 2001. When security concerns prompted the cancellation of the tournament, Canada disbanded their training camp. The tournament was then reinstated and held on schedule. The Canadian Soccer Association announced they would not be able to participate in the reinstated tournament.

Canada had another strong showing in the 2002 CONCACAF Gold Cup, losing to the United States in the semi-finals in penalties, and then defeating South Korea in the third-place game, 2–1. There was a Gold Cup held the following year so as to hold the event in years between the World Cup and the Olympics, and Canada was eliminated in the first round on goal difference. Head coach Osieck had seen the side progress. The manager resigned in September 2003 and former player Colin Miller was put in charge as an interim.

2004 marked the beginning of 2006 World Cup qualification and a new era under the guidance of former Canadian skipper Frank Yallop. Things began brightly, with the Canadians dispatching of Belize handily in the Premilinary Round, 8–0 on aggregate, in a home-and-home series. Matters turned, however, with Canada finishing bottom in a group featuring Costa Rica, Guatemala, and Honduras. They managed only 5 points from 6 matches and a −4 goal difference. Hard times continued under Yallop as the Canucks again went out at the first barrier in the Gold Cup, losing to both the US and Costa Rica, while defeating Cuba. The manager stayed on through 2005 into the following summer, overseeing a series a friendlies against European sides. He resigned on June 7, 2006, finishing with a win-lose record of 8–9–3.

Things turned around under interim coach Stephen Hart's guidance. Canada opened their 2007 CONCACAF Gold Cup campaign with a 2–1 win over Costa Rica. A 1–2 upset loss to upstarts Guadeloupe was followed by a 2–0 victory over Haiti, securing Canada first-place in their group. They next beat Guatemala 3–0 in their quarter-final match setting up a semi-final showdown with the host Americans. Substitute Iain Hume scored for Canada in the 76th minute to cut the United States' lead to 2–1. After the United States were reduced to ten men, Canada pressed for the equalizer but were denied when Atiba Hutchinson's stoppage-time goal was incorrectly flagged offside by linesman Ricardo Louisville and Canada was eliminated.

The team faced criticism for its poor handling of goalkeeper Greg Sutton, who suffered a concussion during a practice prior to the start of the Gold Cup. Without a doctor accompanying the team, Sutton instead saw a local physician who cleared him to practice, resulting in Sutton suffering post-concussion syndrome. Sutton was lost to his professional club Toronto FC for nearly a year.

Prior to the Gold Cup on May 18, 2007, the Canadian Soccer Association announced that former national team player Dale Mitchell would take over as head coach of the senior team after the 2007 FIFA U-20 World Cup. Mitchell had previously served as an assistant coach under Coach Frank Yallop.  Under Mitchell, Canada drew friendlies with Iceland and against Costa Rica, lost 0–2 to South Africa, had a 1–0 win over Martinique, and a 0–2 defeat to Estonia. Optimism grew, however, as Canada played well in a 2–3 loss to Brazil.

Despite defeating Saint Vincent and the Grenadines 7–1 on aggregate in a second-round series—they had had a bye in the first—Canada did not play at the level they had at the Gold Cup and were eliminated from qualifying for the 2010 World Cup. They conceded an equalizer shortly after scoring the opening goal in a 1–1 draw to Jamaica at BMO Field, conceded two second-half goals in quick succession in a 1–2 home loss to Honduras at Saputo Stadium, and then lost away to Mexico and Honduras. They finished last in the four-team group with just 2 points from 6 matches. On March 27, 2009, head coach Dale Mitchell was fired. The president of the Canadian Soccer Association, Dominic Maestracci, said that "the Canadian Soccer Association is committed to the future of our men's national team program. We have made this decision to move the program in a new direction." Technical director Stephen Hart was renamed as interim head coach. On December 9, 2009, Hart was named as head coach.

2010s
Stephen Hart's first competitive action as the full-time head coach was a poor showing at the 2011 CONCACAF Gold Cup, not managing to get out of the group stage. However, during the early stages qualifying for the 2014 World Cup, Canada topped their group in the second round but were eliminated in the third round of CONCACAF qualifying, finishing one point behind Honduras and Panama after losing 8–1 in Honduras on the final match day.

After a series of interim coaching changes following Stephen Hart's dismissal on October 12, 2012 Benito Floro replaced Colin Miller as Canada's coach on August 1, 2013. Being a coach with top-flight management experience in La Liga, he was expected to help Canada raise its competitiveness prior to 2018 FIFA World Cup qualification. In the midst of Floro's player identification and restructuring phase, the team experienced many difficulties including a 958-minute goal-scoring drought, which was finally broken by Atiba Hutchinson in a 1–1 draw with Bulgaria on May 23, 2014. Despite showing improvement with two draws in Europe, Canada continued to shed FIFA points having gone winless for nearly two years, and sank to their lowest ever FIFA ranking of 122 in August 2014. Canada ended a 16-match winless streak on September 10, 2014, defeating Jamaica 3–1 in Toronto.

Canada was drawn into the 2018 FIFA World Cup second round of qualifying against Dominica in June 2015. Canada entered the second round of 2018 World Cup qualifying against Dominica with a game at Windsor Park in Dominica which they won 2–0 with goals from Cyle Larin and a penalty converted by Russell Teibert. In the return leg at BMO Field in front of 9,749 fans they defeated Dominica 4–0 with two goals from Tosaint Ricketts and one each from Tesho Akindele and Cyle Larin.

The team did not score a single goal and finished last in their group in the 2015 CONCACAF Gold Cup after two 0–0 draws to El Salvador and Costa Rica, while also suffering a 1–0 loss against Jamaica.

Canada then advanced to the third round of 2018 World Cup qualifying against Belize, winning 4–1 on aggregate and advancing to the fourth round of 2018 World Cup qualifying. Canada was drawn into a group against Honduras, El Salvador and Mexico. They played their first pair of matches in the fourth round on November 13 and 17, 2015. The first match was played in Vancouver at BC Place against Honduras, resulting in a 1–0 win for Canada thanks to a deflected goal by Cyle Larin. The crowd of 20,108 set a new record for the Canadian men's team in the province of British Columbia.  In their next game on November 17, away at El Salvador, Canada drew with El Salvador 0-0 as Julian De Guzman broke Canada's record for most caps for the national team with his 85th cap, passing Paul Stalteri's record of 84 caps. With this result in Canada's last game of 2015, they ended off the year conceding just three goals in their final 12 games and in 14 games overall, they ended off with a record of 6 wins, 6 draws, and 2 losses.

On March 25, 2016, in a World Cup qualifier against Mexico at BC Place Stadium in Vancouver, 54,798 people were recorded in the stadium which set a new attendance record for a Canadian national team of any sport. Ultimately, however, Canada lost the game 3–0, but remained in second place in the group, keeping them in contention for World Cup qualification. On September 6, 2016, after not being able to qualify for the fifth round of the 2018 World Cup qualifying despite a 3–1 win over El Salvador, head coach Benito Floro was sacked on September 14, ending his reign as coach of the national team.

Canada announced Octavio Zambrano as the new coach of the national team on May 16, 2017, replacing Michael Findlay who was the interim coach after Floro's departure. He guided Canada to a quarterfinal finish at the 2017 CONCACAF Gold Cup, with the team getting out of the group stage for the first time since 2009. However, on January 8, 2018, Zambrano was let go and was replaced with John Herdman, who previously was the head coach of the Canadian women's national team.

Under Herdman, Canada qualified for the top division in the inaugural season of the CONCACAF Nations League following an undefeated qualifying campaign. Competing in CONCACAF Nations League A, Canada earned a 2–0 victory over the United States at BMO Field, Canada's first win against their American rivals since 1985. However, Canada would fall to a 4–1 defeat against the United States in the away leg and failed to qualify for the Nations League Finals.

2020s 
Canada's national team was marked by the arrival of a generation of new young players, led by the first Canadian UEFA Champions League winner Alphonso Davies of Bayern Munich, the most expensive Canadian soccer player in history, Jonathan David who joined Lille for a €30-million fee in 2020 and the establishment of the Canadian Premier League, the first fully professional soccer league in the country. In the first round of World Cup qualifying, Canada finished with a 4–0–0 record to win Group B and progress to the second round. The second round was two leg home-and-away tie against Haiti which Canada won 4–0 on aggregate with a 1–0 win in the away leg and a 3–0 win in the home leg, the latter being played at SeatGeek Stadium in Chicago due to COVID-19 restrictions in Canada. The victory over Haiti led to Canada qualifying for the third and final round of World Cup qualifying for the first time since 1997.

Canada began the third round of World Cup qualifying unbeaten in its first eleven matches, finishing 2021 with its first win over Mexico in over 20 years to finish the year at the top of the table. It also ended the year 40th in the FIFA World Rankings, its highest-ever position to date, earning the team the honour of "Most Improved Side" after having started the year ranked 72nd.

On March 27, 2022, Canada defeated Jamaica 4–0 on Matchday 13 to qualify for the 2022 FIFA World Cup in Qatar. This ended a 36-year drought since the first and only time Canada played in the FIFA World Cup, in 1986. The speed of the team's ascent was such that it was subsequently revealed that neither the federation nor kit supplier Nike had anticipated them qualifying, and as a result they would be the only team in Qatar to not receive special kit for the occasion. Defender Sam Adekugbe remarked "I think that just shows that no one really believed in us. I don't think Canada believed."

In Canada's first match of the tournament against Belgium on November 23, Davies failed to score an early penalty in an eventual 1–0 loss, despite Canada dictating most of the play, and failing to convert any of their 22 shots. Four days later, Davies scored Canada's first ever goal at the FIFA World Cup, in a game against Croatia. Still, Croatia came back to win 4–1, eliminating Canada from the tournament after two matches. Canada were defeated 2–1 by Morocco in their final group match on December 1, finishing in last place with zero points, though Canada made history by scoring two goals in the FIFA World Cup for the first time in the history. Despite elimination, Canada's participation was considered a major success as it helped foster the rebirth of Canadian soccer and served as preparation for the 2026 FIFA World Cup, where Canada will serve as co-hosts, along with the United States and Mexico.

Rivalries

United States

Canada has a longstanding rivalry with the United States. This stems from a generally friendly rivalry between the two nations. The two teams frequently face each other in the Gold Cup. The United States currently leads the series 16-10-12 (W-L-T). Historically, the United States has been the stronger side, having qualified for 11 World Cups while Canada qualified for two. Despite the fact that games between the two teams tends to be tightly-contested, until recently, Canada was not seen as a competitive rival by a number of American fans as it had not beaten the United States in a 34-year stretch. That streak was snapped on October 15, 2019, when Canada defeated the United States 2–0 at BMO Field in Toronto. The following month, on November 15, the United States beat Canada 4–1 in Orlando. Since then, matches between the two have been very competitive. The United States defeated Canada 1–0 in a 2021 Gold Cup matchup in Kansas City. In 2022 World Cup qualifying, Canada earned a 1–1 draw in Nashville and defeated the United States 2–0 in Hamilton.

Stadiums

During 2022 FIFA World Cup qualifying, Canada used BMO Field in Toronto, Commonwealth Stadium in Edmonton, and Tim Hortons Field in Hamilton. BMO Field is Canada's largest natural turf stadium, followed by Saputo Stadium, in Montreal. Canada played their 2018 FIFA World Cup qualifiers at BC Place in Vancouver.

Results and fixtures

The following is a list of match results in the last 12 months, as well as any future matches that have been scheduled.

 Legend

2022

2023

Coaching staff

Coaching history
Caretaker managers are listed in italics.

  Don Petrie (1957)
  Peter Dinsdale (1968–1970)
  Frank Pike (1970–1973)
  Eckhard Krautzun (1973–1977)
  Barrie Clarke (1979–1981)
  Tony Waiters (1981–1985, 1985–1986, 1990–1991)
  Bruce Wilson (1985)
  Bob Bearpark (1986–1987)
  Tony Taylor (1988–1989)
  Bob Lenarduzzi (1989–1990, 1992–1997)
  Bruce Twamley (1998)
  Holger Osieck (1999–2003)
  Colin Miller (2003, 2013)
  Frank Yallop (2004–2006)
  Stephen Hart (2006–2007, 2009)
  Dale Mitchell (2007–2009)
  Stephen Hart (2009–2012)
  Tony Fonseca (2013)
  Benito Floro (2013–2016)
  Michael Findlay (2016–2017)
  Octavio Zambrano (2017–2018)
  John Herdman (2018–present)

Players

Current squad
The following 23 players were named for the 2022-23 CONCACAF Nations League matches against Curaçao and Honduras on March 25 and 28, 2023 respectively.

Caps and goals as of December 1, 2022, after the match against Morocco.

Recent call-ups
The following players have been called up within the last 12 months.
 

 

 

 

 

 
 
 

 

 

  = Injured
  = Preliminary squad
  = Retired
  = No longer eligible

Individual records 

Players in bold are still active with Canada.

Most appearances

Top goalscorers

Competitive record
 Champions   Runners-up   Third place   Tournament played fully or partially on home soil

FIFA World Cup

CONCACAF Gold Cup

*Denotes draws include knockout matches decided via penalty shoot-out.

CONCACAF Nations League

FIFA Confederations Cup

*Denotes draws include knockout matches decided via penalty shoot-out.

Summer Olympics

NAFC / NAFU Championship

Head-to-head record 
Key
 

The following table shows Canada's all-time official international record per opponent:

Honours

Major competitions
 CONCACAF Championship / Gold Cup
 Champions (2): 1985, 2000
 Third place: 2002

Other competitions
 North American Nations Cup
 Winners: 1990

 Summer Olympics
 Winners: 1904

 CONCACAF Olympic Qualifying Tournament
 Runners-up: 1984

Kits

Kit makers

See also
 Canada men's national under-23 soccer team
 Canada men's national under-20 soccer team
 Canada men's national under-17 soccer team
 Canada men's national futsal team
 Soccer in Canada
 Canada women's national soccer team
 Women's Soccer in Canada
 The Voyageurs
 1986 FIFA World Cup squad
 2022 FIFA World Cup squad

References

Further reading

External links

 Canadian Soccer Association
 FIFA profile
 Canada Soccer records and results 2023
 RSSSF archive of most capped players and highest goalscorers
 International Results until 1999

 
North American national association football teams
Soccer in Canada
Canadian Soccer Association